Straight Branch may refer to:

Straight Branch (Deepwater Creek), a stream in Missouri
Straight Branch (Spencer Creek), a stream in Missouri